KIGL (93.3 FM), known as "93.3 The Eagle", is a classic rock radio station licensed to Seligman, Missouri but based in Fayetteville, Arkansas. KIGL is owned by iHeartMedia, Inc. KIGL serves the Northwest Arkansas, extreme Southwest Missouri, and extreme Northeast Oklahoma region with an ERP of 100,000 watts.

Cities in KIGL's primary coverage include: Fayetteville, Springdale, Bentonville, Rogers, and Siloam Springs, in Arkansas; Neosho, Monett, and Pineville in Missouri; and Grove, Oklahoma. KIGL's signal can be heard as far south as Alma, Arkansas, as far west as Pryor, Oklahoma, as far east as Harrison, Arkansas, and just north of Carthage, Missouri, due to interference from KMXV (93.3 FM) in Kansas City.

External links

IGL
Classic rock radio stations in the United States
Radio stations established in 1984
1984 establishments in Missouri
IHeartMedia radio stations
1984 establishments in Arkansas